Amtrak operates the following intercity and long-distance passenger train routes.



Current routes
Amtrak service is divided into three categories of routes: Northeast Corridor routes, state-supported routes, and long distance routes. These types indicate how the service is funded. Northeast Corridor service is directly subsidized by federal appropriations. Federally-supported long distance services are subsidized by appropriations under a separate line item from the NEC in federal budgets. Additionally, Amtrak partners with 17 states to provide additional short- and medium-distance services desired by those states. They are subsidized by periodic payments to Amtrak from the state partners. Three routes – the Carolinian, Northeast Regional, and Vermonter – are state-subsidized only on the sections of their routes off the Northeast Corridor (north of New Haven, and south of Washington).

The Northeast Regional and San Joaquin have branches served by different trips, while the Empire Builder and Lake Shore Limited split into two sections to serve branches. On the Capitol Corridor, Cascades, Empire Service, Keystone Service, Northeast Regional, and Pacific Surfliner, some or all trips do not run the full length of the route.

Full listing

This listing included current and discontinued routes operated by Amtrak since May 1, 1971. Some intercity trains were also operated after 1971 by the Alaska Railroad, Chicago, Rock Island and Pacific Railroad, Chicago South Shore and South Bend Railroad, Denver and Rio Grande Western Railroad, Georgia Railroad, Reading Company, and Southern Railway. The Southern Railway and D&RGW routes were taken over by Amtrak in 1979 and 1983 respectively.

Northeast Corridor
As inherited from Penn Central, most names for Northeast Corridor trains – except for the Metroliner and Clocker– were used for only one one-way or round-trip train. These names were frequently changed from the 1970s to the 1990s. These named trains were consolidated under the NortheastDirect brand in 1995, though individual names appeared on timetables from 1996 to 1999. The Acela Regional brand was used for all-electric service beginning in 2000. Northeast Corridor service, except for the Acela Express, was rebranded Regional in 2003 and finally Northeast Regional in 2008.

This listing shows only trains operated primarily on the Northeast Corridor and the New Haven–Springfield Line, plus extensions of those trains into Virginia. Trains serving endpoints outside these areas are listed separately.

Empire Corridor
Trains operating over the Empire Corridor (the former New York Central Railroad Water Level Route) are now collectively known as the Empire Service. The name was used by the New York Central beginning in 1967, but dropped by Amtrak in 1971. Amtrak restored the Empire Service brand  with the June 11, 1972 timetable, and added individual train names on the May 19, 1974 timetable. As was done on the Northeast Corridor with NortheastDirect, individual train names for New York-Albany and New York-Niagara Falls service were dropped on October 28, 1995 and replaced with Empire. The individual names were re-added in November 1996, but dropped in favor of Empire Service in May 1999.

Keystone Corridor
Trains providing local intercity service on the Philadelphia to Harrisburg Main Line (the former Pennsylvania Railroad main line) to Harrisburg are now collectively known as the Keystone Service, a name originally introduced in 1981. From 1990 to 2006, individual trains were listed in timetables as Keystone, a name also applied to two different trains in 1971–72 and 1979–81. This table includes only trains that did not operate west of Harrisburg.

This listing includes trains operating over the full length of the Keystone Corridor to Pittsburgh. Some trains have offered connections at 30th Street Station while others only stopped at North Philadelphia; most have not offered local service east of Harrisburg. Since 2005, the Pennsylvanian is the only train to operate between Harrisburg and Pittsburgh.

Northeast
These routes operated in the Northeastern United States. Empire Corridor, Keystone Corridor, and Northeast Corridor routes are not included in this table.

South
{| class="wikitable"
|-
! scope="col" | Name
! scope="col" | Route
! scope="col" | Service began
! scope="col" | Service ended
! Notes
|- bgcolor="ddffdd"
|  †
| Lorton – Sanford
| 
| present
|
|-
| 
| New York City – Savannah
| 
| 
|
|-
| 
| New York City – Jacksonville
| 
| 
| 
|- bgcolor="ddffdd"
|rowspan=2| †
|rowspan=2|New York City – Charlotte
| 
| 
| Section of Palmetto, split in Richmond
|- bgcolor="ddffdd"
| 
| present
| Section of Palmetto splitting in Rocky Mount until 1991
|- bgcolor="FFE6BD"
|  ‡
| New York City – St. Petersburg
| 
| 
| Inherited from the PC/RF&P/SCL Champion. Consolidated with the Silver Meteor.
|- bgcolor="d0e7ff"
|  †‡
| New York City – New Orleans
| 
| present
| Conveyed from the Southern Railway's Southern Crescent.
|- bgcolor="FFE6BD"
|  ‡
| New York City – Miami
| 
| 
| Replaced by the Vacationer for the 1972–1973 season.
|-
| 
| Chicago – Miami/St. Petersburg
| 
| 
| Replaced the South Wind
|-
| 
| New York City – Mobile
| 
| 
| Through operation with the Crescent.
|-
| rowspan=2| 
| rowspan=2| New Orleans – Mobile
| 
| 
| 
|-
| 
| 
| 
|-
| 
| Boston – Miami/St. Petersburg
| 
| 
| Joint operation of Silver Meteor and Champion (train)|Champion.
|-
| 
| New York City – Miami
| 
| 
| Replaced the Vacationer.
|- bgcolor="ddffdd"
|rowspan=5|  †
| New York City – Savannah
| 
| 
| 
|- bgcolor="ddffdd"
| New York City – Jacksonville
| 
| 
| 
|- bgcolor="ddffdd"
| New York City – Tampa
| 
| 
| Replaced the Silver Meteor'''s Tampa section.
|- bgcolor="ddffdd"
| New York City – Miami
| 
| 
| Renamed from the Silver Palm.
|- bgcolor="ddffdd"
| New York City – Savannah
| 
| present
| 
|- bgcolor="ddffdd"
|  †
| Raleigh – Charlotte
| 
| present
| 
|- bgcolor="d0e7ff"
|rowspan=2|  †‡
|rowspan=2| New York City – Miami
| 
| 
| Inherited from the PC/RF&P/SCL Silver Meteor. Renamed Meteor.
|- bgcolor="d0e7ff"
| 
| present
| Renamed from the Meteor.
|-
| 
| Miami – Tampa
| 
| 
|
|-
| 
| New York City – Miami
| 
| 
| Renamed the Palmetto|- bgcolor="d0e7ff"
|  †‡
| New York City – Miami
| 
| present
| Inherited from the PC/RF&P/SCL Silver Star.
|-
|
|Chicago – Miami/St. Petersburg
|
|
|Inherited from the PC/L&N/SCL South Wind; replaced by the Floridian|-
| 
| New York City – Miami
| 
| 
| Seasonal operation; replaced the Florida Special. Replaced by the Miamian for the 1974 – 1975 season.
|}

Northeast – Midwest
These routes operated from the Northeast to the Midwest. Routes that ran via the Empire Corridor or Keystone Corridor are also listed in those tables.

Midwest

Midwest–West

West

Cascades Corridor

All regional service between Vancouver, British Columbia and Eugene, Oregon has been known as  since 1998. Prior to this, individual trains or services had unique names. This table includes only trains that did not operate beyond the corridor.

See also
List of North American named passenger trains

Notes

 References 

Bibliography
 
 
 Craig Sanders, Ph.D. and Mark D. Bej, M.D. Amtrak's First Trains – 5/1/1971
 Schafer, Mike. Amtrak's atlas, Trains June 1991
 Edmonson, Harold A. Passenger Trains on the Eve of Amtrak 4/30/1971, Journey to Amtrak'' (Kalmbach Publishing, 1972) 
 

 
Amtrak routes